Nicole Chouraqui (18 March 1938 – 31 August 1987) was a French economist and politician.  She served as deputy secretary general of the RPR, France. She was a member of the European Parliament.

Biography
Born on 18 March 1938 in Algiers, Algeria, Nicole Chouraqui was the daughter of business manager Félix Dahan and his wife Marcelle Cohen-Bacri,  director of a kindergarten. She studied at the Delacroix high school in Algiers.  On a scholarship, she continued her higher education at the Public Service section of the  Paris Institute of Political Studies from where she graduated in 1959.

In 1960, she joined as a financial analyst at the Banque de l'Union Parisienne, a French investment bank.  She later became the director of the French Broadcasting and Television Office (ORTF) in 1970 and started an economic magazine. In 1971, she founded the school of economics for women, also called the “Center Eurofemme”, which trained a large number of students.

She began her political career with the Radical Party of France.  She later, at the request of Jacques Chirac, joined the RPR. From 1978, she was in charge of the party's associative pole, and then she became the deputy secretary general of the party. She was the councilor of Paris, representing the 19th arrondissement, where a street was named after her. From 17 July 1979 to 16 October 1980, she served as a member of the European Parliament. On 24 July 1984, she was elected as a deputy mayor of Paris and she held this position until her death.

She was married to insurer Claude Chouraqui.

She died on 31 August 1987 in Paris as a result of cancer.

References

1938 births
1987 deaths
 
Radical Party (France) politicians
Sciences Po alumni
Politicians of the French Fifth Republic
Rally for the Republic politicians